James Edward Byrd (born October 3, 1968) is a former Major League Baseball player. He batted and threw right-handed.

The Boston Red Sox selected Byrd in the eighth round of the 1987 MLB Draft out of Seminole State College. He had a brief major league career in the 1993 season, as he was used by the Red Sox in two games exclusively as a pinch runner for Andre Dawson (May 31) and Ernest Riles (June 1), during a series against the Kansas City Royals at Fenway Park.

Byrd also spent seven seasons in the Boston and Milwaukee Brewers Minor League systems, playing mostly at shortstop for six different teams. In a 773-game career, he posted a .219 batting average with 21 home runs and 99 stolen bases, driving in 190 runs while scoring 282 times.

After his playing days, Byrd managed from 1996 through 2000 for the Gulf Coast Rangers (1996), Port Charlotte Rangers (1998–2000) and  Tulsa Drillers (2000).

References

External links
, or Retrosheet

1968 births
Living people
Arizona League Red Sox/Mariners players
Baseball players from Florida
Boston Red Sox players
El Paso Diablos players
Lynchburg Red Sox players
Major League Baseball designated hitters
Minor league baseball managers
New Britain Red Sox players
Pawtucket Red Sox players
People from Wewahitchka, Florida
Winter Haven Red Sox players
African-American baseball players
Seminole State Trojans baseball players